Phú Nghĩa is a rural commune of Bù Gia Mập District, Bình Phước Province, Vietnam.

References

Populated places in Bình Phước province
District capitals in Vietnam